Asperula nitida is a species of flowering plant in the family Rubiaceae. It was first described in  1806 and is endemic to Turkey.

References 

nitida
Flora of Turkey